Prince Ferdinand Maria of Bavaria (Ferdinand Maria Ludwig Franz von Assisi Isabellus Adalbert Ildefons Martin Bonifaz Joseph Isidro; 10 May 1884 – 5 April 1958) was a prince of the House of Wittlesbach and Infante of Spain, the eldest son and child of Ludwig Ferdinand of Bavaria and his wife, Infanta María de la Paz of Spain. Ferdinand became an Infante of Spain on 20 October 1905 and renounced his rights to the throne of the Kingdom of Bavaria in 1914.

Early years 
Prince Ferdinand María was born on 10 May 1884 at the Royal Palace of Madrid. His father was Prince Ludwig Ferdinand of Bavaria, son of Prince Adalbert of Bavaria and Infanta Amalia of Bourbon. His mother was Infanta María de la Paz of Bourbon, daughter of Queen Isabella II and King Francisco de Asís. Through both his parents, Prince Ferdinand María was a first cousin of King Alfonso XIII, who was two years younger than him. He was baptized at the Royal Palace of Madrid.

In 1886, when he was two years old, his aunt the Queen Regent awarded him the Grand Cross of the Order of Charles III.

Shortly after his birth, his parents moved to Bavaria, where his two siblings Adalbert and Pilar were born. Prince Ludwig Ferdinand was the only member of the Bavarian Royal Family who always remained on friendly terms with his cousin, King Ludwig II (with the exception of Elisabeth, Empress of Austria). When Ludwig II was arrested at Neuschwanstein Castle in 1886, he called Ludwig Ferdinand for help; the latter immediately intended to follow this call, but was prevented from leaving Nymphenburg Palace by his uncle Luitpold who was about to take over government as the ruling Prince Regent. From 1878 the family resided at Palais Ludwig Ferdinand, their town-house in Munich

He attended the Bavarian War Academy (Bayerische Kriegsakademie), attaining the rank of Second Lieutenant of Heavy Cavalry in the Bavarian Army. Then, he returned to Spain.

Marriage and naturalisation
On 20 October 1905, King Alfonso XIII announced the marriage between his elder sister Infanta María Teresa and Prince Ferdinand Maria. The announcement was gazetted in the Gazette of Madrid as follows: "For the sake of My Royal Family and of the Nation, after having heard My Council of Ministers, I shall give My Royal Consent to the contract of marriage between My Most Beloved and Most Dear Sister Infanta María Teresa and My Most Beloved Cousin Prince Ferdinand Maria of Bavaria and Bourbon. My Government will inform the Cortes this My Royal Resolution". That same day, Prince Ferdinand Maria naturalised and the king granted unto him the title and prerogative of Infante of Spain, by grace. He was also invested a Knight of the Order of the Golden Fleece and was granted the Collar and Grand Cross of the orders of Charles III and Isabella the Catholic, respectively.

The wedding took place  on 12 January 1906 at the Royal Palace of Madrid. Ferdinand and María Teresa had four children:.

 Infante Luis Alfonso, Prince of Bavaria (6 December 1906 – 14 May 1983)
Infante Jose Eugenio, Prince of Bavaria (26 March 1909 – 16 August 1966), married Dona María de la Asunción Solange de Mesía y de Lesseps, Countess of Odiel in 1933, and had issue.
Infanta María de las Mercedes of Spain (3 October 1911 – 11 September 1953) married Georgian Prince Irakli Bagration of Mukhrani in 1946, and had issue.
Infanta María del Pilar, Princess of Bavaria (15 September 1912 – 9 May 1918)

The couple settled down in Spain and moved into the newly built Cuesta de la Vega Palace in Madrid, which was their main residence.

Career 

Prince Ferdinand María was incorporated into the Spanish Army with the rank of cavalry lieutenant in 1905. He was commissioned into the 20th Hussars of Pavia Regiment. On 23 June 1908, he was promoted to Commander and was commissioned into the 12th Lusitania Rifle Regiment. He was moved to Africa with his regiment and took part in the Rif War.

This marriage and the granted royal rank in Spain meant that Ferdinand (also known as Infante don Fernando María de Baviera y de Borbón), the third-generation Spanish-Bavarian, committed himself to Spain. His second marriage with a Spanish noblewoman changed nothing in that respect.

Ferdinand married for a second time to María Luisa de Silva y Fernández de Henestrosa, Duchess of Talavera de la Reina, daughter of Luis de Silva y Fernández, 10th Count of Pie de Concha and his wife, Maria de los Dolores Fernández de Henestrosa y Fernández de Córdoba, on 1 October 1914 in Fuenterrabía, Spain. Maria Luisa was also granted the title Infanta of Spain.

Later life

Ferdinand survived his mother by 12 years and his father by 9 years. He had Alfonso XIII of Spain as his first cousin and brother-in-law and Prince Carlos of Bourbon-Two Sicilies as another brother-in-law. Spanish claimants Infante Jaime, Duke of Segovia, and Infante Juan, Count of Barcelona, were his nephews.

Honours and arms
National orders and decorations
 :
 Knight of St. Hubert
 Jubilee Medal
 :
 Grand Cross of the Order of Charles III, 18 November 1886; with Collar, 20 October 1905
 Knight of the Golden Fleece, 20 October 1905
 Grand Cross of the Order of Isabella the Catholic, 20 October 1905
 Knight of the Royal Cavalry Armory of Seville, 1905
 Knight of the Royal Nobility Corps of Madrid, 1909
 Grand Commander of León of the Order of Santiago, 27 June 1910
 Grand Cross of the Naval Merit Order, with White Decoration, 1922
 Bailiff Grand Cross of Honour and Devotion of the Spanish Order of St. John

Foreign orders and decorations

Arms

Ancestry

References

Spanish infantes
Princes of Bavaria
1884 births
1958 deaths
House of Wittelsbach
Nobility from Madrid
Knights of the Golden Fleece of Spain
Knights Grand Cross of the Order of Isabella the Catholic
Knights of Santiago
2
2
Honorary Knights Grand Cross of the Royal Victorian Order
Members of the Teutonic Order
Grand Crosses of the Order of Saint Stephen of Hungary
Knights of Malta
Grand Croix of the Légion d'honneur
Grand Crosses of Naval Merit
Recipients of the Order of the White Eagle (Russia)
Recipients of the Order of St. Anna, 1st class
Recipients of the Order of Saint Stanislaus (Russian), 1st class